William Rathbone III (1726–1789) was a member of the noted Rathbone family of Liverpool.

The eldest son of William Rathbone II, he was a merchant and ship-owner within Liverpool. A devout Quaker, and committed opponent of the slave trade, he married twice, fathering eleven children, including William Rathbone IV.

External links
 University of Liverpool Rathbone Collection

Businesspeople from Liverpool
English abolitionists
English Quakers
1726 births
1789 deaths
William
Quaker abolitionists